See Clear Now is the fifth studio album by English grime artist  Wiley. The album was released on 10 November 2008. It was originally set to be released as I See Clear on 13 October 2008.

The album features collaborations with electropop group Hot Chip, and DJ/producer Mark Ronson in "Cash in My Pocket" (contributing "a few trumpets... but it's not brass overload"). The album's first single, "Wearing My Rolex" was succeeded by the single "Summertime" on 22 September and "Cash in My Pocket".

Critical reception

Background

Wiley describes See Clear Now as "[his] first pop album", explaining that he wants to "push boundaries" while also "stay[ing] in the charts by making tunes that connect with people. It's pop all the way from here". He explained that he had wanted to work with Lily Allen since hearing her debut album Alright, Still, and that his collaboration with Hot Chip came about after the two acts performed a version of "Wearing My Rolex" at the 2008 Glastonbury Festival. He also expressed a desire to be "the male equivalent of Missy Elliott" in relation to blending pop appeal with musical innovation.

He adds that people should listen to Race Against Time (2009) instead because it isn't commercial and he would have more artistic control.

Track listing

References

2008 albums
Atlantic Records albums
Wiley (musician) albums